CBS has televised the Masters in the United States every year since 1956, when it used six cameras and covered only the final four holes. Tournament coverage of the first eight holes did not begin until 1995 because of resistance from the tournament organizers, but by 2007, more than 50 cameras were used. Chairman Jack Stephens felt that the back nine was always more "compelling", increased coverage would increase the need for sponsorship spending, and that broadcasting the front nine of the course on television would cut down on attendance and television viewership for the tournament. USA Network added first- and second-round coverage in 1982. The Masters has been broadcast every year in high-definition television since 2005, one of the first golf tournaments to ever hold that distinction. In 2008, ESPN replaced USA as broadcaster of early-round coverage. These broadcasts use the CBS Sports production staff and commentators, although then-ESPN personality Mike Tirico previously served as a studio host (replacing Bill Macatee's role under USA Network).

Coverage overview

CBS (1956–present)
As previously mentioned, CBS has televised the Masters Tournament in the United States every year since 1956, when it used six cameras and covered only the final four holes. Because of resistance from the tournament organizers, 18 hole coverage did not begin until 2002 (coverage generally joining with the final group on the fifth or sixth hole all four days), but by 2006, over 50 cameras were used. USA Network added first- and second-round coverage in 1982, which was also produced by the CBS production team.

The previously independent USA Sports became part of NBC Sports through NBCUniversal in 2005, meaning the cable and network coverage of the Masters was split between rival companies. However, USA continued to use its own graphics for sports, and CBS continued to produce their coverage of the Masters, an arrangement that lasted through 2007. ESPN, another rival of CBS Sports, took over in 2008. However, ESPN uses CBS graphics and production with the CBS logo.

In 2007, CBS broadcast the tournament with high-definition fixed and handheld wired cameras, as well as standard-definition wireless handheld cameras. that same year, CBS also added "Masters Extra," an hour's extra full-field bonus coverage daily on the internet, preceding the television broadcasts. In 2008, CBS added full coverage of holes 15 and 16 live on the web.

While Augusta National Golf Club has consistently chosen CBS as its U.S. broadcast partner, it has done so on successive one-year contracts. Due to the lack of long-term contractual security, as well as the club's limited dependence on broadcast rights fees (owing to its affluent membership), it is widely held that CBS allows Augusta National greater control over the content of the broadcast, or at least perform some form of self-censorship, in order to maintain future rights. The club, however, has insisted it does not make any demands with respect to the content of the broadcast.

There are some controversial aspects to this relationship. Announcers refer to the gallery as "patrons" rather than spectators or fans ("gallery" itself is also used), and use the term "second cut" instead of "rough" (however, the second cut is normally substantially shorter than comparable "primary rough" at other courses). Announcers who have been deemed not to have acted with the decorum expected by the club have been removed, notably Jack Whitaker and analyst Gary McCord. Whitaker referred to the gallery at the end of the 18-hole Monday playoff in 1966 as a "mob" and missed five years (1967–1971); McCord last worked on the Masters telecast in 1994, being banned that summer after using the terms bikini wax and body bags in his descriptions. There also tends to be a lack of discussion of any controversy involving Augusta National, such as the 2003 Martha Burk protests. However, there have not been many other major issues in recent years.

The final round of the 1994 Masters was the final on-air assignment for Pat Summerall on CBS Sports. CBS had lost the rights to the National Football Conference to Fox (where Summerall and his broadcasting colleague, John Madden would soon move over to) prior to the 1994 NFL season. But much like Vin Scully did in 1982 after calling his final NFL game (the NFC Championship Game between the San Francisco 49ers and Dallas Cowboys), Pat Summerall stayed at CBS a couple more months so he could make the 1994 Masters his final broadcast for CBS, where he was a mainstay for over 30 years.

Summerall signed off the broadcast thus, surrounded by the other CBS commentators that were working the tournament:

The 2020 Masters Tournament was delayed until November due to the ongoing COVID-19 pandemic. Schedule changes were made because of sunset around 5:24 p.m. and legal end of civil twilight at 5:51 p.m. each day. To accommodate CBS's coverage of the NFL Week 10 games (and, additionally, ensure that play will conclude before sunset), the final round will be scheduled so that coverage can begin at 10:00 a.m. ET (similar to the 2019 Masters final round, which was moved up due to the threat of storms) and conclude around 2:30 p.m. ET. CBS was only assigned late-afternoon NFL games (4:05 p.m. ET starts) for that week. Furthermore, CBS's SEC football game, normally a 3:30 p.m. ET game, was assigned for a 6:00 p.m. ET kickoff so that it could air after the conclusion of third round coverage, which will end before sunset. However, the SEC game was postponed due to COVID-19 cases among one of the participating teams, leading to CBS scheduling only College Football Today after the conclusion of coverage, and giving the rest of the game's broadcast window back to affiliates and network programming.

On November 12, 2020, Sports Business Journal reported that the conclusion of the final round of the Masters on Sunday, November 15 could be broadcast on ABC, if weather or a playoff extended the action beyond 4 p.m., when CBS would transition to NFL coverage.

USA Network (1982–2007)
The USA Network began first and second round Masters coverage in 1982, which was also produced by the CBS production team. This was the first ever cable coverage for one of the golf majors. Initially, the USA Network provided Thursday and Friday coverage for 2 hours live each day along with a prime time replay.  In 1995, USA expanded the Thursday/Friday coverage to 2.5 hours each day. In 2003 and 2004, both CBS and USA televised the Masters commercial-free. In 2005, USA increased the Thursday/Friday coverage to 3 hours.

In early 2006, it was announced that USA was outbid by Golf Channel for its early-round PGA Tour rights, with USA's final season being 2006.  NBC/Universal, parent company of USA Network, traded away the network's Ryder Cup coverage through 2012 to ESPN for the rights to sign Al Michaels.  However, USA did renew its Masters contract for one final year. USA would televise the 2007 Masters before being outbid by ESPN. The 2007 Masters was also the final event for USA Sports, which was dissolved into parent NBC Sports after the tournament. All future sports telecasts on USA would use NBC's graphics and personalities.

ESPN (2008–present)
ESPN replaced USA in 2008 as the broadcaster for the early rounds. ESPN originally used Mike Tirico and Curtis Strange as their commentary team inside Butler Cabin. However, Mike Tirico left for NBC Sports in 2016 and was replaced by Scott Van Pelt. ESPN also used Tom Rinaldi for interviews until he left for Fox Sports in 2021.

Early round coverage of The Masters continues to be aired by ESPN, however, coverage is produced by CBS and uses CBS announcers and graphics (excluding Van Pelt, Strange, and Rinaldi).

International coverage

The BBC has broadcast the Masters in the UK since 1963, and it also provides live radio commentary on the closing stages on Radio Five Live. Coverage was also provided by ITV between 1979-1982 and Channel 4 between 1983 and 1985.BBC Sport held the exclusive TV and radio rights through to 2010. The BBC's coverage airs without commercials because it is financed by a licence fee.

From the 2011 Masters, Sky Sports began broadcasting all four days, as well as the par 3 contest in HD and, for the first time ever, in 3D. The BBC will only have highlights of the first two days' play but will go head to head with Sky Sports, with full live coverage on the final two days of play. From 2020, live coverage moved to Sky on an exclusive basis, with the BBC showing highlights of each days play.

In Ireland, Setanta Ireland previously showed all four rounds, and from 2017 until closure in 2021, Eir Sport broadcast all four rounds live having previously broadcast the opening two rounds with RTÉ broadcasting the weekend coverage. Sky Sports now shows the whole event exclusively live in Ireland, like in the UK.

In Canada, broadcast rights to the Masters are held by Bell Media, with coverage divided between TSN (cable), which carries live simulcasts and primetime encores of CBS and ESPN coverage for all four rounds, CTV (broadcast), which simulcasts CBS's coverage of the weekend rounds, and RDS, which carries French-language coverage.

In Japan, Tokyo Broadcasting System Television is an only broadcaster since 1976.

Prior to 2013, Canadian broadcast rights were held by a marketing company, Graham Sanborn Media, which in turn bought time on the Global Television Network, TSN, and RDS (except for 2012 when French-language coverage aired on TVA and TVA Sports) to air the broadcasts, also selling all of the advertising for the Canadian broadcasts. This was an unusual arrangement in Canadian sports broadcasting, as in most cases broadcasters acquire their rights directly from the event organizers or through partnerships with international rightsholders, such as ESPN International (ESPN owns a 20% minority stake in TSN).

In 2013, Global and TSN began selling advertising directly, and jointly produced their own preview and highlights shows for Canadian audiences (while still carrying ESPN/CBS coverage for the tournament itself).

In Australia, the tournament has been broadcast live on the Nine Network since 2018.

In Spain, Canal+ held the Masters rights since the 90s up until July 2015, when they were transferred to Telefónica after the Spanish telecommunications company bought Canal+. Movistar+' premium golf channel Movistar Golf airs the par 3 contest on Wednesday and live tournament coverage for all four rounds. #Vamos offers partial live coverage in simulcast with Movistar Golf as well as encore coverage shortly after the end of each round. In 2020 and for the first time, Movistar+ will have two separate live broadcasts of the Masters with Movistar Deportes airing live coverage of the Featured Groups, the Amen Corner and the 15th and 16th holes.

Commentators

Play-by-play/anchors

Analysts

On-course reporters

See also
List of PGA Tour on CBS commentators
List of ESPN/ABC golf commentators
PGA Tour on USA#Commentators

References

External links
CBS ANNOUNCERS AT THE MASTERS (1956–2004)
Masters 57-Year Broadcast History
CBS Masters Announcers 1956–2013
The Masters Archives – Awful Announcing
SEARCH RESULTS: THE MASTERS (310) - Sports Media Watch

CBS Sports
USA Network Sports
ESPN announcers
Broadcasters
Lists of golf writers and broadcasters
CBS Radio Sports
Westwood One